Emme Fahu Vindha Jehendhen is a 2015 Maldivian romantic-drama film, starring Mohamed Jumayyil and Mariyam Majudha in the lead roles. The film was released on 5 April 2015. The film is loosely based on the novel 'Love Story' by American novelist Erich Segal.

Plot
Ryan (Mohamed Jumayyil), a rich boy and Meera (Mariyam Majudha), an ordinary girl meet while holidaying in an island and fall madly in love. But tragedy strikes when they decide to get married. Despite his father's (Mohamed Manik) discontentment, Ryan marries Meera only to find him being cut off from his father's wealth. Their perfect life is thrown into turmoil when Ryan learns that Meera has blood cancer.

Since Ryan has been cut off his father's property he can't afford Meera's treatment. On top of this Ryan's mother died from a heart attack leaving him more devastated. Not wanting Meera to leave him Ryan tries his best to keep her happy. Meanwhile, Ryan gets fired from his job due a conspiracy by his rival.

After being jobless, Ryan has no option but to take help from his father for financial support, but after seeing his father's ego he refused to accept his help. 
After few days Meera come to know about her health condition, and both Meera and Ryan decided to go abord for treatment. On their way to airport Meera faints and gets hospitalised. Meera's get condition worsen day by day, while Ryan kept on praying fot her recovery. On doctor's advice, Ryan takes Meera home and try to keep her happy as she has very little time left to live. However Meera dies in Ryan's arms with the assurance that no matter that Ryan will support her till her last pulse.

The film ends with Afeef regret for his mistake of considering Meera as a gold digger and apologise Ryan for it, but Ryan doesn't forgive him as Afeef is the reason he lost his Meera forever.

Cast
 Mohamed Jumayyil as Ryan
 Mariyam Majudha as Meera
 Ali Azim as Ryan's friend 
 Mohamed Manik as Afeef, Ryan's father
 Sheela Najeeb as Inaya, Ryan's mother
 Khadheeja Ibrahim Didi as Amira
 Roanu Hassan Manik as Samad, Ryan's boss
 Adam Rizwee as Dr. Najaah Ali 
 Ali Shazleem as Ahusan, Ryan's rival at work. 
 Fathimath Shama as Meera's friend

Soundtrack

Accolades

References

External links
 
 

2015 films
2015 romantic drama films
Maldivian romantic drama films
Dark Rain Entertainment films
Films directed by Ali Shifau
Dhivehi-language films